Moulthun Ly (born 20 November 1991) is an Australian chess player. He was awarded the Grandmaster title by FIDE in 2016 to become Australia's sixth grandmaster (GM). He is the first person born in Cambodia to become an International Master or a Grandmaster.

Chess career 
Ly earned his first two International Master (IM) norms in 2006 at the World Open in Philadelphia and the Essent Open in Hoogeveen. He attained his final IM norm at the Doeberl Cup in Canberra in 2010. He was awarded the title of International Master the following year.

Ly picked up his first GM norm by winning the Sydney International Chess Open in 2014 with a score of 7.0/9. He achieved his last two GM norms in 2016 at the Tradewise Gibraltar Chess Festival, where he scored 6.0/10; and the Abu Dhabi International Chess Festival, where he scored 5.5/9.

In 2020, he won the 54th Begonia Open on tie-breaks from Mark Chapman, Zong-Yuan Zhao and Jesse Jager.

Personal life 
Ly grew up in Queensland, Australia. He is the founder and editor of 50 Moves Magazine, a chess magazine which he operates with contributions from leading Australian players such as fellow Australian grandmasters Ian Rogers and Max Illingworth.

Ly is currently the Head of Online Learning at Australian Junior Chess on Cloud, and publishes videos weekly on Molton, his personal YouTube channel.

References

External links 
 
 Moulthun Ly chess games at 365Chess.com

1991 births
Living people
Australian chess players
Cambodian emigrants to Australia
Chess grandmasters
Australian people of Cambodian descent